The legislative districts of Sultan Kudarat are the representations of the province of Sultan Kudarat in the various national legislatures of the Philippines. The province is currently represented in the lower house of the Congress of the Philippines through its first and second congressional districts.

History 

Prior to gaining separate representation, areas now under the jurisdiction of Sultan Kudarat were represented under the Department of Mindanao and Sulu (1917–1935) and Cotabato (1935–1972).

The enactment of Presidential Decree No. 341 on November 22, 1973 created the Province of Sultan Kudarat out of the reduced Cotabato Province's southern municipalities. This new province was represented in the Interim Batasang Pambansa as part of Region XII from 1978 to 1984.

Sultan Kudarat first gained separate representation in 1984, when it returned one representative, elected at large, to the Regular Batasang Pambansa.

Under the new Constitution which was proclaimed on February 11, 1987, the province constituted a lone congressional district, and elected its member to the restored House of Representatives starting that same year.

The approval of Republic Act No. 9357 on October 10, 2006 increased Sultan Kudarat's representation by reapportioning the province into two congressional districts, which elected their separate representatives starting in the 2007 elections.

1st District 
City: Tacurong
Municipalities: Columbio, Isulan, Lambayong, Lutayan, President Quirino
Population (2020): 427,963

2nd District 
Municipalities: Bagumbayan, Esperanza, Kalamansig, Lebak, Palimbang, Senator Ninoy Aquino
Population (2020): 426,089

Lone District (defunct)

At-Large (defunct)

See also 
Legislative district of Mindanao and Sulu
Legislative district of Cotabato

References 

Sultan Kudarat
Politics of Sultan Kudarat